Tapeinochilos ananassae, also known as Indonesian wax ginger, Pineapple ginger, Red wax ginger, or Giant Spiral ginger, is an herb in the family Costaceae described as a species in 1866. It is native to Queensland, New Guinea, and the Indonesian Province of Maluku. It is perennial, with a physical height of 6-8 feet and a spread of 5-7 feet. It has evergreen leaves and yellow flowers within red bracts. As a greenhouse or indoor plant, their flowers are valued for their beauty.

See also 

 Tapeinochilos
 Costaceae

References

Costaceae
Flora of Queensland
Flora of New Guinea
Flora of the Maluku Islands
Plants described in 1866